NSB Class 68 is a three-car electric multiple unit operated by Norges Statsbaner between 1956 and 2001. It was mainly used for local trains as well as branch lines. The units were built in two series, the A-series being delivered in 21 units between 1956-58 and the B-series in nine units between 1960–61. The motor cars were built by Norsk Elektrisk & Brown Boveri and Skabo while the centre and end cars were built either by Skabo or by Strømmen.

Though the units were taken out of service between 1994 and 2001, three units were taken over by the Ofotbanen for operation on the Ofoten Line.

External links

Entry at the Norwegian Railway Club
Entry at Jernbanet.net

68
Vehicles introduced in 1956
68
15 kV AC multiple units